The North European Zone Formula 3 Cup, also known as the NEZ Formula 3 Cup, was an open wheel racing series based in Northern Europe. The series ran from 2008 to 2009. The NEZ member counties are Denmark, Estonia, Finland, Iceland, Lithuania, Latvia, Norway, Russia and Sweden.

Scoring system
In each two race of the weekend, points are awarded to the top twelve finishers, with 25 points for a win. A bonus point is awarded for the fastest qualifying time and for the fastest lap of each race. The same scoring system is used in all FIA NEZ racing championships and cups.

Champions

See also
Formula Three

References

External links
NEZ Formula 3 Championship at forix.com
NEZ Formula 3 Cup official website

2008 establishments in Europe
2009 disestablishments in Europe
Formula Three series
Defunct auto racing series